Johanna "Jannie" van Eyck-Vos (19 January 1936 – 16 June 2020) was a Dutch track and field athlete. She competed at the 1964 Summer Olympics in the 800 m event but failed to reach the final despite setting a personal record. She started as a javelin thrower and won a national title in 1956, but then changed to middle-distance running and won another title, in 1966, in the 800 m.

References

1936 births
2020 deaths
Athletes (track and field) at the 1964 Summer Olympics
Dutch female javelin throwers
Dutch female middle-distance runners
Olympic athletes of the Netherlands
Sportspeople from Hilversum
20th-century Dutch women
21st-century Dutch women